Cebuano is an Austronesian language spoken in the southern Philippines. It is natively called by its generic term Bisaya or Binisaya (both translated into English as Visayan, though this should not be confused with other Bisayan languages) and sometimes referred to in English sources as Cebuan. It is spoken by the Visayan ethnolinguistic groups native to the islands of Cebu, Bohol, Siquijor, the eastern half of Negros, the western half of Leyte, and the northern coastal areas of Northern Mindanao and the Zamboanga Peninsula. In modern times, it has also spread to the Davao Region, Cotabato, Camiguin, parts of the Dinagat Islands, and the lowland regions of Caraga, often displacing native languages in those areas (most of which are closely related to the language). 

While Tagalog has the largest number of native speakers among the languages of the Philippines today, Cebuano had the largest native-language-speaking population in the Philippines from the 1950s until about the 1980s. It is by far the most widely spoken of the Bisayan languages.

Cebuano is the lingua franca of the Central Visayas, western parts of Eastern Visayas, some western parts of Palawan and most parts of Mindanao. The name Cebuano is derived from the island of Cebu, which is the source of Standard Cebuano. Cebuano is also the primary language in Western Leyte — noticeably in Ormoc. Cebuano is assigned the ISO 639-2 three-letter code ceb, but not a ISO 639-1 two-letter code.

Nomenclature
The term Cebuano derives from "Cebu"+"ano", a Latinate calque, reflective of the Philippines's Spanish colonial heritage. In common or everyday parlance, especially by those speakers from outside of the island of Cebu and in fact in Cebu the language is more often referred to as Bisaya. Bisaya, however, may become a source of confusion to non-native speakers as many other Bisayan languages may also be referred to as Bisaya even though they are not mutually intelligible with speakers of what is referred to by linguists as Cebuano. Cebuano in this sense applies to all speakers of vernaculars mutually intelligible with the vernaculars of Cebu island, regardless of origin or location, as well as to the language they speak.

The term Cebuano has garnered some objections. For example, generations of Cebuano speakers in Leyte, Bohol, and Northern Mindanao (Dipolog, Dapitan, Misamis Occidental and Misamis Oriental together with coastal areas of Butuan) say that their ancestry traces back to Cebuano speakers native to their place and not from immigrants or settlers from the Visayas. Furthermore, they ethnically refer to themselves as Bisaya and not Cebuano, and their language as Binisaya.

Classification

Cebuano is an Austronesian language; it is generally classified as one of the five primary branches of the Bisayan languages, part of the wider genus of Philippine languages.

Geographical distribution
Cebuano is spoken in the provinces of Cebu, Bohol, Siquijor, Negros Oriental, northeastern Negros Occidental, (as well as the municipality of Hinoba-an and the cities of Kabankalan and Sipalay to a great extent, alongside Ilonggo), southern Masbate, western portions of Leyte and Biliran (to a great extent, alongside Waray), and a large portion of Mindanao, notably the urban areas of Zamboanga Peninsula, Cagayan de Oro, Davao Region, Surigao and Cotabato. Some dialects of Cebuano have different names for the language. Cebuano speakers from Cebu are mainly called "Cebuano" while those from Bohol are "Boholano" or "Bol-anon". Cebuano speakers in Leyte identify their dialect as Kanâ meaning that (Leyte Cebuano or Leyteño). Speakers in Mindanao and Luzon refer to the language simply as Binisaya or Bisaya.

History

Cebuano was first documented in a list of vocabulary compiled by Antonio Pigafetta, an Italian explorer who was part of Ferdinand Magellan's 1521 expedition. Spanish missionaries started to write in the language during the early 18th century. As a result of the eventual 333-year Spanish colonial period, Cebuano contains many words of Spanish origin.

While there is evidence of a pre-Spanish writing system for the language, its use appears to have been sporadic. Spaniards recorded the Visayan script which was called Kudlit-kabadlit by the natives. 

The language was heavily influenced by the Spanish language during the period of Spanish rule from 1565 to 1898. With the arrival of Spanish colonists, for example, a Latin-based writing system was introduced alongside a number of Spanish loanwords.

Phonology

Vowels
Below is the vowel system of Cebuano with their corresponding letter representation in angular brackets:

  an open front unrounded vowel similar to English "father"
  an open-mid front unrounded vowel similar to English "bed"
  a close front unrounded vowel similar to English "machine"
  a close-mid back rounded vowel similar to English "forty"
  a close back rounded vowel similar to English "flute"

This was later expanded to five vowels with the introduction of Spanish. They can be freely switched with each other without losing their meaning (free variation); though it may sound strange to a native listener, depending on their dialect. Loanwords, however, are usually more conservative in their orthography and pronunciation (e.g. dyip, "jeepney" from English "jeep", will never be written or spoken as dyep).

Consonants
For Cebuano consonants, all the stops are unaspirated. The velar nasal  occurs in all positions, including at the beginning of a word (e.g. ngano, "why"). The glottal stop  is most commonly encountered in between two vowels, but can also appear in all positions.

Like in Tagalog, glottal stops are usually not indicated in writing. When indicated, it is commonly written as a hyphen or an apostrophe if the glottal stop occurs in the middle of the word (e.g. tu-o or tu'o, "right"). More formally, when it occurs at the end of the word, it is indicated by a circumflex accent if both a stress and a glottal stop occurs at the final vowel (e.g. basâ, "wet"); or a grave accent if the glottal stop occurs at the final vowel, but the stress occurs at the penultimate syllable (e.g. batà, "child").

Below is a chart of Cebuano consonants with their corresponding letter representation in parentheses:

If  is in between two like vowels, the  may be dropped completely and the vowel lengthened. For example, dala ("bring"), becomes da; and tulod ("push") becomes tud. For example, kalatkat, "climb", becomes katkat ( not ).

In some parts of Bohol and Southern Leyte,   is also often replaced with   when it is in the beginning of a syllable (e.g. kalayo, "fire", becomes kalajo). For example, baboy ("pig") can not become baboj, but baboya can become baboja.

All of the above substitutions are considered allophonic and do not change the meaning of the word.

In rarer instances, the consonant  might also be replaced with  when it is in between two vowels (e.g.

Stress
Stress accent is phonemic, which means that words with different accent placements, such as dapít (near) and dápit (place), are considered separate. The stress is predictably on the penult when the second-to-last syllable is closed (CVC or VC). On the other hand, when the syllable is open (CV or V), the stress can be on either the penultimate or the final syllable (although there are certain grammatical conditions or categories under which the stress is predictable, such as with numbers and pronouns).

Grammar

Cebuano uses VSO sentence structure.

Vocabulary

Cebuano is a member of the Philippine languages. Early trade contact resulted in a large number of older loan words from other languages being embedded in Cebuano, like Sanskrit (e.g.

However, today it is more common for Cebuano speakers to spell out those words in their original English forms rather than with spelling that conforms to Cebuano standards.

Phrases
A few common phrases in Cebuano include:
 How are you? (used as a greeting) - Kumusta/Kamusta ka?
 Good morning - Maayong buntag
 Good afternoon (specifically from 12:00 PM to 12:59 PM) - Maayong udto
 Good afternoon (specifically from 1:00 PM to 3:00 PM) - Maayong palis
 Good afternoon (specifically from 3:00 PM to 6:00 PM) - Maayong hapon
 Good evening - Maayong gabii
 Goodbye
 Ari na ko ("I'll be here", casual)
 Ayo-ayo ("Take care", formal)
 Adyos (rare, from Spanish "adiós")
 Babay (informal, from English "Bye-bye")
 Amping ("Take care")
 Hangtod sa sunod nga higayon ("Until next time")
 Adto na ko ("I will go now")
 You're so beautiful - Gwapa/Maanyag/Matahom kaayo ka
 Thanks! - Salamat
 Thank you - Salamat sa imo
 Many thanks! - Daghang Salamat
 Thank you very much! - Daghan kaayong salamat 
 You're welcome - Wala'y sapayan
 Do not (imperative) - Ayaw
 Don't know - Ambot or Wala ko kabalo
 Yes - Oo, O
 Maybe - Basin/Tingali
 No
Dili - for future verb negation ("will not", "does/do not", "not going to"); and negation of identity, membership, property, relation, or position ("[he/she/it/this/that] is not")
Wala - for past and progressive verb negation ("have not", "did not"); and to indicate the absence of ("none", "nothing", "not have", "there is not")
 Who? - Kinsa?
 What? - Unsa?
 Where? 
 Diin?/Dis-a? - where (past)
 Hain? - where (present), which
Asa? - where (future, general)
 Which? - Hain? 
 When?
 Kanus-a? - when (past)
 Anus-a? - when (future)
 How?
 Giunsa? - how (past)
 Unsaon? - how (future)
 Why? - Ngano?
 This/These
 Kiri - this/these (1st person)
 Kini - this/these (1st & 2nd person)
 That/Those
 Kana - that/those (2nd person)
 Kadto - that/those (3rd person)

Dialects

The de facto Standard Cebuano dialect (sometimes referred to as General Cebuano) is derived from the conservative Sialo vernacular spoken in southeastern Cebu (also known as the Sialo dialect or the Carcar-Dalaguete dialect). It first gained prominence due to its adoption by the Catholic Church as the standard for written Cebuano. It retains the intervocalic . In contrast, the Urban Cebuano dialect spoken by people in Metro Cebu and surrounding areas is characterized by  elision and heavily contracted words and phrases. For example, balay ("house"), dalan ("road"), kalahâ ("pan"), and kalayo ("fire") in Standard Cebuano can become bay, dan, kahâ, and kayo in Urban Cebuano respectively, while the phrase waláy problema ("no problem") in Standard Cebuano can become way 'blema in Urban Cebuano.

Colloquialisms can also be used to determine the regional origin of the speaker. Cebuano-speaking people from Cagayan de Oro and Dumaguete, for example, say chada or tsada/patsada (roughly translated to the English colloquialism "awesome") and people from Davao City say atchup which also translated to the same English context; meanwhile Cebuanos from Cebu on the other hand say nindot or, sometimes, aníndot. However, this word is also commonly used in the same context in other Cebuano-speaking regions, in effect making this word not only limited in use to Cebu.

There is no standardized orthography for Cebuano, but spelling in print usually follow the pronunciation of Standard Cebuano, regardless of how it is actually spoken by the speaker. For example, baláy ("house") is pronounced  in Standard Cebuano and is thus spelled "baláy", even in Urban Cebuano where it is actually pronounced .

Cebuano is spoken natively over a large area of the Philippines and thus has numerous regional dialects. It can vary significantly in terms of lexicon and phonology depending on where it is spoken. Increasing usage of spoken English (being the primary language of commerce and education in the Philippines) has also led to the introduction of new pronunciations and spellings of old Cebuano words. Code-switching forms of English and Bisaya (Bislish) are also common among the educated younger generations.

There are four main dialectal groups within Cebuano aside from the Standard Cebuano and Urban Cebuano. They are as follows:

Boholano 
The Boholano dialect of Bohol shares many similarities with the southern form of the standard Cebuano dialect. It is also spoken in some parts of Siquijor. Boholano, especially as spoken in central Bohol, can be distinguished from other Cebuano variants by a few phonetic changes:
The semivowel y is pronounced : iya is pronounced ;

Leyte

Southern Kanâ
Southern Kanâ is a dialect of both southern Leyte and Southern Leyte provinces; it is closest to the Mindanao Cebuano dialect at the southern area and northern Cebu dialect at the northern boundaries. Both North and South Kana are subgroups of Leyteño dialect. Both of these dialects are spoken in western and central Leyte and in the southern province, but the Boholano is more concentrated in Maasin City.

Northern Kanâ 
North Kanâ (found in the northern part of Leyte), is closest to the variety of the language spoken in northern part of Leyte, and shows significant influence from Waray-Waray, quite notably in its pace which speakers from Cebu find very fast, and its more mellow tone (compared to the urban Cebu City dialect, which Kana speakers find "rough").

Mindanao 
This is the variety of Cebuano spoken throughout most of Mindanao and it is the standard dialect of Cebuano in Northern Mindanao.

Local historical sources found in Cagayan de Oro indicates the early presence of Cebuano Visayans in the Misamis-Agusan coastal areas and their contacts with the Lumads and peoples of the Rajahnate of Butuan. Lumads refer to these Visayan groups as "Dumagat" ("people of the sea") as they came in the area seaborne. It became the lingua franca of precolonial Visayan settlers and native Lumads of the area, and particularly of the ancient Rajahnate of Butuan where Butuanon, a Southern Visayan language, was also spoken. Cebuano influence in Lumad languages around the highlands of Misamis Oriental and Bukidnon was furthered with the influx of Cebuano Visayan laborers and conscripts of the Spaniards from Cebuano areas of Visayas (particularly from Bohol) during the colonial period around the present-day region of Northern Mindanao. It has spread west towards the Zamboanga Peninsula, east towards Caraga, and south towards Bukidnon, Cotabato and the Davao Region in the final years of Spanish colonial rule and even during the American colonial rule which continued until the Philippine independence. Cebuano becomes a lingua franca in Bangsamoro Autonomous Region in Muslim Mindanao along with Tagalog, especially among Tausug people who speaks a language which is 1 of the Visayan languages.

Similar to the Sialo dialect of southeastern Cebu, it is distinctive in retaining /l/ sounds, long since considered archaic in Urban Cebuano. For example: bulan instead of buwan ("moon" or "month"), dalunggan instead of dunggan (ear), and halang instead of hang ("spicy").

Due to the influx of migrants (mostly from Western Visayas and Leyte) during the promotion of settlement in the highlands of Central Mindanao in the 1930s, vocabulary from other Visayan languages (predominantly Hiligaynon and Waray-Waray) have also been incorporated into Mindanao Cebuano. For example, the Hiligaynon sábat ("reply") is commonly used alongside Cebuano tubag, bulig alongside tábang ("help"), and Waray lutô alongside kan-on ("cooked rice"). Though, these influences are only limited to the speakers along the port area and Hiligaynon-speaking communities.

Davaoeño 

A branch of Mindanaoan Cebuano in Davao is also known as Davaoeño (not to be confused with the Davao variant of Chavacano which is called "Castellano Abakay"). Like the Cebuano of Luzon, it contains some Tagalog vocabulary, which speakers may use even more frequently than in Luzon Cebuano. Its grammar is similar to that of other varieties; however, current speakers exhibit uniquely strong Tagalog influence in their speech by substituting most Cebuano words with Tagalog ones. This is because the older generations speak Tagalog to their children in home settings, and Cebuano is spoken in other everyday settings, making Tagalog the secondary lingua franca. One characteristic of this dialect is the practice of saying atà, derived from Tagalog yatà, to denote uncertainty in a speaker's aforementioned statements. For instance, a Davaoeño might say "Tuá man atà sa baláy si Manuel" instead of "Tuá man tingáli sa baláy si Manuel". The word atà does exist in Cebuano, though it means 'squid ink' in contrast to Tagalog (e.g. atà sa nukos).

Other examples include: Nibabâ ko sa jeep sa kanto, tapos niulî ko sa among baláy ("I got off the jeepney at the street corner, and then I went home") instead of Ninaog ko sa jeep sa eskina, dayon niulî ko sa among baláy. The words babâ and naog mean "to disembark" or "to go down", kanto and eskina mean "street corner", while tapos and dayon mean "then"; in these cases, the former word is Tagalog, and the latter is Cebuano. Davaoeño speakers may also sometimes add Bagobo or Mansakan vocabulary to their speech, as in "Madayawng adlaw, amigo, kumusta ka?" ("Good day, friend, how are you?", literally "Good morning/afternoon") rather than "Maayong adlaw, amigo, kumusta ka?" The words madayaw and maayo both mean 'good', though the former is Bagobo and the latter Cebuano.

Negros
The Cebuano dialect in Negros is somewhat similar to the Standard Cebuano (spoken by the majority of the provincial areas of Cebu), with distinct Hiligaynon influences. It is distinctive in retaining  sounds and longer word forms as well. It is the primary dialectal language of the entire province of Negros Oriental and northeastern parts of Negros Occidental (while the majority of the latter province and its bordered areas speaks Hiligaynon/Ilonggo), as well as some parts of Siquijor. Examples of Negrense Cebuano's distinction from other Cebuano dialects is the usage of the word maot instead of batî ("ugly"), alálay, kalálag instead of kalag-kalag (Halloween), kabaló/kahíbaló and kaágo/kaántigo instead of kabawó/kahíbawó ("know").

Luzon 
There is no specific Luzon dialect, as speakers of Cebuano in Luzon come from many different regions in Central Visayas and Mindanao. Cebuano-speaking people from Luzon in Visayas can be easily recognized primarily by their vocabulary, which incorporates Tagalog words. Their accents and some aspects of their grammar can also sometimes exhibit Tagalog influence. Such Tagalog-influenced Cebuano dialects are sometimes colloquially known as "Bisalog" (a portmanteau of Tagalog and Bisaya).

Saksak sinagol
The term saksak sinagol in context means "a collection of miscellaneous things" or literally "inserted mixture", thus the few other Cebuano-influenced regions that have a variety of regional languages use this term to refer to their dialects with considerable incorporated Cebuano words. Examples of these regions can be found in places like Masbate.

Examples

Numbers

Cebuano uses two numeral systems. Currently, the native system is mostly used in counting the number of things, animate and inanimate, e.g. the number of horses or houses. The Spanish-derived system, on the other hand, is exclusively applied in monetary and chronological terminology and is also commonly used in counting from 11 and above.

Shapes

Colors

See also

 Boholano dialect
 Cebuano grammar
 Cebuano literature
 Cebuano people
 Classical Cebuano
 Hiligaynon language
 Jacinto Alcos
 Languages of the Philippines

Notes

References

External links

 Cebuano Dictionary
 Cebuano English Searchable Dictionary
 John U. Wolff, A Dictionary of Cebuano Visayan: Volume I, Volume II, searchable interface, Downloadable text at Project Gutenberg
 Ang Dila Natong Bisaya
 Lagda Sa Espeling Rules of Spelling (Cebuano)
 Language Links.org - Philippine Languages to the world - Cebuano Lessons
 Online E-book of Spanish-Cebuano Dictionary, published in 1898 by Fr. Felix Guillén
 Cebuano dictionary
Online bible, video and audio files, publications and other bible study material in Cebuano language 

 
Verb–subject–object languages